Sukh By Chance is an Indian television series that airs on Sony Entertainment Television, based on the story of a middle-class Gujarati family, the Mehtas, with modest financial earnings. The series premiered on 10 November 2009. It ended on 13 May 2010.

Plot
The story revolves around a poor middle-class family, who literally scan through their pockets at the end of every month to get even a penny. All of a sudden, lady luck smiles on them, and they become rich. All the scarcities in their lives are now taken over by big bank balances, and various luxuries. With money coming in, their lifestyle changes, as do their mentalities. However, they are satisfied with their material assets and more involved in deriving happiness from the little joys of life found in sharing life within a big, happy household. They not only continue to reside under one roof amicably, but have a common joint bank account operated by the patriarch of the family.

Cast
Sanjeev Jogtiyani ... Mohan
Bharti Patil ... Sarla Mehta
Ujjwal Chopra ... Rajesh Mehta
Upasana Shukla ... Rajni Mehta
Shyam Pathak ... Dheeraj Mehta
Shreya More ... Kokila Mehta
Ketkie Jain ... Tina, Dheeraj and Kokila's daughter
Neel Patel ... Montu, Dheeraj and Kokila's son
Anuj Thakur ... Amit
Krishna Bharadwaj ... Akash
Vibha Anand ... Namrata
Harsh Chhaya ... Ashwin Mehta/Chandan Mehta
Silambarasan

References

External links
Sukh By Chance Official Site on Sony TV India
Sukh By Chance Episodes Download

Sony Entertainment Television original programming
Indian drama television series
Indian television soap operas
2009 Indian television series debuts
2010 Indian television series endings
Hats Off Productions